Father Yod (pronounced Yōde), or YaHoWha, born James Edward Baker (July 4, 1922 – August 25, 1975), was the American cult founder and owner of one of the country's first health food restaurants, on the Sunset Strip in Los Angeles. He founded a spiritual commune in the Hollywood Hills known as the Source Family. The Source Family was heavily influenced by the teachings of Yogi Bhajan and the astrological age of Aquarius. The Family practiced communal living in Southern California and later in Hawaii. He was also the frontman of the commune's experimental psychedelic rock band, Ya Ho Wha 13.

Early life
James Edward Baker was born on July 4, 1922, in Cincinnati, Ohio. Although he said he had been awarded the Silver Star while serving in the Marine Corps during World War II, the Corps does not carry his name in its official listing of Silver Star recipients.  Baker also said he had become an expert in jujutsu. He moved to California to become a Hollywood stuntman and was influenced by the Nature Boys, a Los Angeles-based group of beats who lived a natural lifestyle, maintained vegetarian diets, and lived "according to Nature's Laws". Baker also studied philosophy, religion and esoteric spiritual teachings, even becoming a Vedantic monk for a time. He later became a follower of Yogi Bhajan, a Sikh spiritual leader and teacher of Kundalini Yoga.

In 1969, Baker founded the Source Restaurant on Los Angeles's Sunset Strip. The restaurant served organic vegetarian food, with such celebrity regulars as John Lennon, Julie Christie and Marlon Brando. Jim Baker had two other successful restaurants on Sunset Strip: the Aware Inn and the Old World.

Despite claims that he had fourteen different wives, he had only one legal wife as James Baker, Robin Popper, to whom he was married in 1970. They had a daughter together, Tau, born August 14, 1974. Robin said that at the time he was "a dirty old man on a lust trip".

Source Family
Baker left Yogi Bhajan in the late 1960s and created his own philosophy based on Western mystery tradition. Changing his name to Father Yod and Ya Ho Wha, Baker became the patriarch of a commune of young people, who considered him their spiritual father. The group, known as the Source Family, lived together in a Hollywood Hills mansion in Los Feliz (the former Chandler estate, built in 1914 for Harry Chandler) and was supported by the earnings of the restaurant, which grossed $10,000 a day during its peak popularity.

Some of the doctrines of the Source Family were kept secret; however, they generally adopted a way of life that promoted natural health, organic vegetarian diets, communal living and utopian ideals. Father Yod/Ya Ho Wha had a core communal group of 150 people living in Los Feliz. He as Father Yod and Yahowha had 14 wives and 3 children. His wives were named Makushla, Isis, Astral, Heaven, Prism, Aquariana, Harvest Moon, Galaxy, Lovely, Paralda, Hypatia, Tantalayo and Venus, with Robin (now Ahom) forming the group. His children were Tau, Buttercup and Yod: (NB: The Source Family)

Music

Death
On December 26, 1974, the Source Family sold their restaurant and moved to Hawaii.  On August 25, 1975, despite having no previous hang gliding experience, Yod decided that he would go hang gliding. Yod used a hang glider to leap off a  cliff on the eastern shore of Oahu. He crash-landed on the beach suffering no external injuries, but was unable to move and died nine hours later. He was 53 years old. The Source Family refers to this day as "Black Monday". After three days of vigil, Yod was cremated and his ashes put to rest at Lanikai Beach in Hawaii.

Legacy

In 2006, two Source Family members, Isis Aquarian and Electricity Aquarian, wrote the history of the religious group. A revised version of the book entitled The Source: The Untold Story of Father Yod, Ya Ho Wa 13 and The Source Family was released in 2007 by Process Media, and included a CD with live Ya Ho Wa 13 performances, radio interviews, and Family recordings. The Source Foundation was set up at www.yahowha.org and released lost family music through Drag City Records, Fathers Morning Meditation Tapes through Global Recording Artist, a comic book, and The Source Family in 2012, co-directed by Jodi Wille and Maria Demopoulous.

Sean Ono Lennon credited the Source Family with inspiring the look and attitude portrayed in the video for his 2013 song "Animals". The experimental sound collage program Over the Edge, hosted by members of Negativland, presented a Source Family retrospective in the second half of the program on the night of June 30, 2017.

The Source Restaurant features in Woody Allen's Annie Hall, when, playing Alvy Singer, Allen orders "Alfalfa sprouts" and "...a plate of mashed yeast".

References

Further reading

 The Source Family are also the subject of a 2012 documentary The Source, directed by Jodi Wille and Maria Demopoulos.

External links
Interview with Isis Aquarian in The Writing Disorder

Singers from Los Angeles
United States Marine Corps personnel of World War II
Accidental deaths from falls
American religious leaders
Cult leaders
1922 births
1975 deaths
20th-century American singers
People from Los Feliz, Los Angeles
Founders of new religious movements